Woven Hand is the self-titled debut album by David Eugene Edwards' Woven Hand.

Track listings
The Good Hand
My Russia
Blue Pail Fever
Glass Eye
Wooden Brother
Ain't No Sunshine
Story and Pictures
Arrowhead
Your Russia
Last Fist

"Ain't No Sunshine" is a cover of the song of the same name by Bill Withers.
Four of the songs ("Ain't No Sunshine," "My Russia," "Your Russia" and "Story and Pictures") appear on Blush/Blush Music in extended versions.

Personnel
David Eugene Edwards
Daniel McMahon
Stephen Taylor

References

2002 debut albums
Wovenhand albums